A  is a type of household cleaning tool that originated in Japan. Consisting of durable cloth strips attached to a stick or pole, it is used for moving dust from surfaces onto the floor where it can be swept up or vacuumed. Similar to a feather duster, it is not to be confused with an ōnusa.

This duster, made of a bamboo pole and cloth strips, is a fixture in every Japanese home.

The hataki does not trap dust but, with its familiar sound, pushes it onto the floor where it can be swept up.

References

Cleaning tools
Japanese tools